The 62nd Santosh Trophy was held from 25 May to 15 June 2008 in Srinagar, Jammu & Kashmir.

Qualifying rounds
Venues:
 Gandhi Memorial Science College Ground, Jammu
 Bakshi Stadium, Srinagar
 Polo Ground, Srinagar

Group I - Jammu

Group II - Jammu

Group III - Srinagar

Group IV - Srinagar

Group V - Srinagar

Group VI - Srinagar

Group VII - Srinagar

Group VIII - Srinagar

Pre-quarterfinal playoffs

Quarterfinal League
Group A

Group B

Semifinals

Final

References

2007–08 in Indian football
2007-08
2007–08 domestic association football cups